The Kansas City Cowboys (also Unions and Kaycees) were a baseball team in the Union Association during its only season, .  Referred to as the "Cowboys" mostly by historians, they had no official nickname during their short life and were most frequently referred to by local press of the day as the "Unions" and by the press of other cities as the "Kaycees".  They were the first professional baseball team to represent Kansas City as well as the city's first major league team. Their home field was called Athletic Park.

They began play as a replacement for the Altoona Mountain City, which collapsed in May, and played out the remainder of the season.  Despite a 16-63 (.203 WL percentage) finish, the franchise was one of only two (the St. Louis club being the other) in the league to make a profit.  In contemporary newspaper reports, the team had Altoona's record (6-19) combined with their own and were considered to have finished last in an eight-team league.  The Unions disbanded shortly after the Union Association voted to dissolve.

1884 season

Season standings

Record vs. opponents

Roster

Player stats

Batting

Starters by position 
Note: Pos = Position; G = Games played; AB = At bats; H = Hits; Avg. = Batting average; HR = Home runs

Other batters 
Note: G = Games played; AB = At bats; H = Hits; Avg. = Batting average; HR = Home runs

Pitching

Starting pitchers 
Note: G = Games pitched; IP = Innings pitched; W = Wins; L = Losses; ERA = Earned run average; SO = Strikeouts

Other pitchers 
Note: G = Games pitched; IP = Innings pitched; W = Wins; L = Losses; ERA = Earned run average; SO = Strikeouts

References and external links
1884 Kansas City Cowboys at Baseball Reference

Defunct Major League Baseball teams
Union Association baseball teams
Kansas City Cowboys
1884 establishments in Missouri
1884 disestablishments in Missouri
Baseball teams established in 1884
Baseball teams disestablished in 1884
Defunct baseball teams in Missouri